Kashary is the name of several rural localities in Russia:
Kashary, Belgorod Oblast, a khutor in Gubkinsky District of Belgorod Oblast
Kashary, Lipetsk Oblast, a selo in Kasharsky Selsoviet of Zadonsky District of Lipetsk Oblast
Kashary, Rostov Oblast, a sloboda in Kasharskoye Rural Settlement of Kasharsky District of Rostov Oblast